Ralph Clem is a Florida International University professor emeritus, USAF General (Retired) and Russian specialist. In addition to being a major professor and prior chair of the Department of International Relations at Florida International University, he also headed the Center for Transnational and Comparative Studies. While he is generally known for his Russian-focused research, his areas of expertise include economics and population studies and Ukraine. Dr. Clem maintains fluency in Russian and has been recognized for his distinguished service in education.

Books
General Clem has authored scholarly articles and several books which focus on Russian economic and military topics.  In the field of Russian studies he is an acknowledged expert and still continues to do consulting work.

His works include:
 Soviet West: Interplay Between Nationality and Social Organization. Praeger Special Studies in International Politics and Government. 
 Research Guide to Russian and Soviet Censuses (Studies in Soviet History and Society). 
 Urban-rural voting differences in Russian Elections, 1995–1996: A rayon level analysis. ASIN: B0006QUV48
 The Russian Parliamentary Elections of 1995: The Battle for the Duma. 
 Spatial Patterns of Political Choice in the Post-Yeltsin Era: The Electoral Geography of Russia's 2000 Presidential Election.
 The End of Eurasia: Russia on the Border Between Geopolitics and Globalization.

Educational awards and recognition
 Fellow of the Kennan Institute of the Woodrow Wilson International Center for Scholars
 Fellow of the Harriman Institute at Columbia University
 Ryder Corporation Excellence in Teaching Award
 Professional Excellence Award (State University System of Florida)

Grants
 National Council for Russian and East European Research
 U.S. Department of State
 John D. and Catherine T. MacArthur Foundation
 U.S. Department of Education

See also
Electoral geography of Russia

References

Florida International University faculty
Living people
United States Air Force generals
United States Air Force reservists
1943 births
Columbia University alumni